Takao Obana (尾花 高夫 Obana Takao, born August 7, 1957 in Kudoyama, Wakayama) is a former Nippon Professional Baseball pitcher and coach. Takao was the Yakult Swallows's fourth pick in the 1978 draft and played the entirety of his 14-year career with the team. He was also the manager of the Yokohama BayStars, the pitching coach for the Swallows, the Chiba Lotte Marines, Fukuoka Daiei Hawks and the Yomiuri Giants.

His daughter Kie is a model.

References

1957 births
Living people
Baseball people from Wakayama Prefecture
Japanese baseball players
Nippon Professional Baseball pitchers
Yakult Swallows players
Managers of baseball teams in Japan
Yokohama DeNA BayStars managers